In mathematics, a Carleson measure is a type of measure on subsets of n-dimensional Euclidean space Rn. Roughly speaking, a Carleson measure on a domain Ω is a measure that does not vanish at the boundary of Ω when compared to the surface measure on the boundary of Ω.

Carleson measures have many applications in harmonic analysis and the theory of partial differential equations, for instance in the solution of Dirichlet problems with "rough" boundary. The Carleson condition is closely related to the boundedness of the Poisson operator. Carleson measures are named after the Swedish mathematician Lennart Carleson.

Definition

Let n ∈ N and let Ω ⊂ Rn be an open (and hence measurable) set with non-empty boundary ∂Ω. Let μ be a Borel measure on Ω, and let σ denote the surface measure on ∂Ω. The measure μ is said to be a Carleson measure if there exists a constant C > 0 such that, for every point p ∈ ∂Ω and every radius r > 0,

where

denotes the open ball of radius r about p.

Carleson's theorem on the Poisson operator

Let D denote the unit disc in the complex plane C, equipped with some Borel measure μ. For 1 ≤ p < +∞, let Hp(∂D) denote the Hardy space on the boundary of D and let Lp(D, μ) denote the Lp space on D with respect to the measure μ. Define the Poisson operator

by

Then P is a bounded linear operator if and only if the measure μ is Carleson.

Other related concepts

The infimum of the set of constants C > 0 for which the Carleson condition

holds is known as the Carleson norm of the measure μ.

If C(R) is defined to be the infimum of the set of all constants C > 0 for which the restricted Carleson condition

holds, then the measure μ is said to satisfy the vanishing Carleson condition if C(R) → 0 as R → 0.

References

External links
 

Measures (measure theory)
Norms (mathematics)